Lisičine is an uninhabited settlement in Croatia, in the municipality of Voćin, Virovitica-Podravina County.

History
Lisičine village is one of many villages established in the course of 16th century around the Voćin fortification in order to provide soldiers to defend the border against the Ottoman invasion.

Culture
In 1748, a wooden Orthodox church of St. George, consecrated by the Bishop of Pakrac and Slavonia, Sofronije Jovanović, was built. A masonry church built in 1869 was damaged in the World War II while its liturgical items and books were all destroyed. The church was restored in 1990, only to be severely damaged in 1991 and its interior burned. The iconostasis was transferred to the treasury of the metropolitan court in Srijemski Karlovci to be restored and become a part of its permanent exhibition.

Demographics
According to the 2011 census, the village of Lisičine has no inhabitants.

Population of the Lisičine village by ethnicity:

Sights
 Lisičine Arboretum - one of the three arboretums in Croatia

Notable natives and residents
 Nikola Miljanović Karaula - antifascist, partisan and People's Hero of Yugoslavia
 Đuro Jorgić - forestry graduate who established the Lisičine Arboretum
 Milenko Jorgić (1956-1991) - JNA captain and military pilot

See also
Voćin massacre

References 

Ghost towns in Croatia
Municipalities of Croatia
Slavonia
Serb communities in Croatia